Longnan is a county-level city under the jurisdiction of Ganzhou Municipality, in the far southwest of Jiangxi province, China, bordering Guangdong province to the south.

Administrative divisions
In the present, Longnan City has 8 towns and 5 townships.
8 towns

5 townships

Traditional vernacular architecture
Longnan is notable for the variety of traditional Hakka walled villages in Jiangxi.
 By one count, there are around 370 of them within the city's boundaries. They are known locally as weiwu or wei; Longnan is also regarded as "the Hometown of Weiwu in China" 新华网-客家围屋之乡. Some of the most famous weiwu are Guangxi Wei 百度百科-关西围屋 and Yanyiwei.关西围屋与燕翼围 Some researchers call them "Jiangxi tulou" (literally, "[tall] earthen buildings"), as opposed to the better known Fujian tulou.

Climate

Famous people from Longnan
 Wang Sheng, a Kuomintang general, and in his later life, Taiwan's ambassador to Paraguay

Notes

External links
Longnan Official Website 

Ganzhou
County-level divisions of Jiangxi